The People Party or Party of Nationals was a political party in South Korea. Its symbolic color was orange. The party was founded by Ahn Cheol-soo in February 2020, after leaving the Bareunmirae Party. It has the same name as the People Party, which was also founded by Ahn and existed from 2016 to 2018.

In the 2020 South Korean legislative election, the party won three representatives for the National Assembly.

The People Party dissolved in April 2022 after merging with the conservative People Power Party.

Political positions 
The party was the successor of the liberal People Party in 2018, but had become more economically liberal overall. People Party is described as a liberal and conservative party.

People Party had somewhat more moderate liberal social positions than the previous old People Party, but it is not free from social conservatism. Ahn Cheol-soo, a key figure of the party, has expressed a negative stance on Seoul's LGBT Pride parade event, called "kwieo-chukje" in Gwanghwamun, Seoul. However, PP did not consistently stress a social conservative stance because it wished to present an image of "alternative politics," and to that end also criticized the conservative PPP in addition to the left-liberal DPK, which are the two "huge political parties". Ahn had criticized both Yoon Seok-youl of the PPP as well as Lee Jae-myung of the DPK for putting too much emphasis on men in their 20s and promoting misogyny.

Merger and dissolution 
On 18 April 2022, party leader Ahn Cheol-soo agreed with a merger with the mainstream conservative People Power Party. This came after Ahn withdrew from the March 2022 Presidential Election in favor of endorsing Yoon Seok-youl for President. Yoon won the election by a narrow margin of 0.7%.

Parliamentary leader for the People Party, Kwon Eun-hee, rejected the merger idea. She stated "I cannot accept the idea of the merger when it only helps to entrench further the nation's political system, which is led primarily by the two major parties, thereby limiting the voices of minor parties." Kwon has requested a release from the Party and from the party unification plans so that she can keep her seat as an independent proportional representative lawmaker in the National Assembly.

Electoral results

See also 
 Centrist reformism
 Liberalism in South Korea
 Conservatism in South Korea
 Third way
 Radical centrism
 Fiscal conservatism

Notes

References

Political parties in South Korea
Political parties established in 2020
Political parties disestablished in 2022
2020 establishments in South Korea
2022 disestablishments in South Korea
Centrist parties in Asia
Conservative parties in South Korea
Korean nationalist parties
Liberal parties in South Korea
National liberal parties
Social conservative parties
Centre-right parties in Asia